The Washing Machine is a 1993 giallo film directed by Ruggero Deodato.

Plot 
Inspector Alexander Stacev is called to the house of three sisters, Ludmilla, Vida and Maria, after Ludmilla claims to have found the dismembered body of Vida's pimp boyfriend Yuri inside their washing machine.  When he arrives and finds no body he tells them there is no case, putting it down to a drunken hallucination.  The sisters think otherwise and follow and pester him about the disappearance of Yuri, luring him into their strange world.

Cast

Production
The Washing Machine was based on a stage play La Lavatrice by Luigi Spagnol. It was shot in Budapest. Deodato described the film as being "made precariously" and without distribution.

Release
The Washing Machine was released in 1993 and did not find distribution in Italy. The film was released on home video in the Netherlands as The Washing Machine.  The Washing Machine was released in 2014 on DVD in the UK by Shameless Screen Entertainment.

Reception
From retrospective reviews, Adrian Luther Smith in his book on Italian giallo found the film to be "one of [Deodato]'s better films" and that Claudio Simonetti's score was "one of the best in recent years."

Deodato gave different reactions to the film on different occasions. In one interview he stated he wasn't happy with the film as the casting was wrong and that the film "was made too quickly… I can only say that I am not at all pleased with the final result because it's a very intimate movie and should have had well-known actors, which it does not. So, after the first few minutes it collapses." In another interview, Deodato described the film as "interesting" and that it was an "erotic-giallo, with a horror tinge to it" and having a Rashomon-theme throughout with characters having different points of view.

References

Sources

External links 
 

1993 films
1990s Italian films
1990s French films
Hungarian thriller films
Giallo films
Films directed by Ruggero Deodato
Films scored by Claudio Simonetti
1990s Italian-language films
Films shot in Budapest
French thriller films